Golovec Hall is an indoor sporting arena located in Celje, Slovenia. The arena has between 2,500 and 3,200 fixed seats, depending on the seating configuration, and an area of 5,000 square metres. It hosts the home games of ŽRK Z'dežele handball club.

Various events take place throughout the year: concerts, major congresses and spring prom-dances.

References

External links
Official page of the management company ZPO Celje

Handball venues in Slovenia
Indoor arenas in Slovenia
Sport in Celje
Buildings and structures in Celje
Sports venues completed in 1976
20th-century architecture in Slovenia